Pasuruan is a city in East Java, Java, Indonesia. It had a population of 186,262 at the 2010 Census and 208,006 at the 2020 Census.

It is surrounded by, but administratively separate from, Pasuruan Regency. It is located around 65 kilometers southeast of Surabaya.

Administrative districts 
Pasuruan is divided into four districts (kecamatan), tabulated below with areas and their population at the 2010 and 2020 Censuses.

Note: (a) Panggungrejo District created since 2010 from parts of neighbouring districts; its population in 2010 is included with that of the districts from which it was formed.

Climate
Pasuruan has a tropical savanna climate (Aw) with little to no rainfall from May to November and heavy rainfall from December to April.

Public transport 
Pasuruan located and connected by provincial main road between Surabaya―Banyuwangi. Pasuruan can be reached from Surabaya by bus or local commuter train, which took at least 2 hours. And also, can be reached from Malang by bus or car that took  at least 1.3 hours. This town linked with other cities by Trans Java Freeway.

The city has an active railway station as a stop for intercity trains and local commuter from Surabaya Kota. To the west before Bangil railway station there's Kraton railway station which is inactive today due to close range from Pasuruan station. In the past, this city had the local steam tram company named Pasoeroean Stoomtram Maatschappij served from 1896 to 1969. This train served as passenger transport as well as freight transport of agricultural products such as sugarcane, tea and tobacco.

Sister cities 
 Sungai Petani, Malaysia

References

External links 
http://www.accuweather.com/id/id/pasuruan/203183/daily-weather-forecast/203183?day=2
https://www.meteoblue.com/en/weather/forecast/modelclimate/pasuruan_indonesia_1632033
Pasuruan Info

 
Populated places in East Java